Syzygium angophoroides is a tree of the family myrtaceae native to Western Australia and the Northern Territory.

It blooms between July and November producing cream flowers.

References

Trees of Australia
Flora of Western Australia
angophoroides
Taxa named by Ferdinand von Mueller